Nusatupe Airport is an airport near Gizo, Solomon Islands  and is a regular Solomon Airlines destination.  It was created in World War II to support USAAF operations by flattening two islands and  joining them together using the spoil. It was subsequently redeveloped in 2011 under a New Zealand aid programme, removing an abrupt level change midway to provide a level strip.  A boat shuttle service ferries passengers to Gizo.  Private boats are able to load from the jetty.

Airlines and destinations

External links
Solomon Airlines Routes

Airports in the Solomon Islands